The men's 30 kilometre freestyle cross-country skiing competition at the 1994 Winter Olympics in Lillehammer, Norway, was held on 14 February at Birkebeineren Ski Stadium.

Results
The results:

References

External links
Results International Ski Federation

Men's cross-country skiing at the 1994 Winter Olympics
Men's 30 kilometre cross-country skiing at the Winter Olympics